Josephine Touray (born 6 October 1979) is a former Danish team handball player and Olympic champion. She received a gold medal with the Danish national team at the 2004 Summer Olympics in Athens.

References

1979 births
Living people
Danish female handball players
Olympic gold medalists for Denmark
Danish people of Gambian descent
Handball players at the 2004 Summer Olympics
Viborg HK players
KIF Kolding players
Olympic medalists in handball
Medalists at the 2004 Summer Olympics